This is a list of wars involving the Federal Republic of Nigeria and its predecessor states.

Other conflicts
 Mbaise Rebellion Battles against the British 1902–1917 – In 1900, the British created the Southern Nigeria Protectorate. The resistance to British colonisation from the people of modern mbaise and igbo's throughout Eastern Nigeria is well documented.
 Bende Onitsha Hinterland Expedition 1905–1906 – The Bende Onitsha Hinterland Expedition is also referred to as the Ahiara Expedition due to the impact it had on the area. There was a lot of hostility between the British and the people of Mbaise following the Aro Expedition.

Oyo Empire (1682–1833)

Battles (1901–1902)
 Battles in the Oguta/Owerri area (November 1901)
 Battles of Esu Itu (December 1901)
 Battles of Arochukwu (December 1901)
 Battle of Edimma (January 1902)
 Battle of Ikotobo (January 1902)
 Battle of Ikorodaka (February 1902)
 Battle of Bende (March 1902)

Colonial Nigeria/British Republic (1800–1960)

First Nigerian Republic (1960–1979)

Civil War (1967–1970)

Second Nigerian Republic (1977–1991)

Third Nigerian Republic (1992–1999)

Fourth Nigerian Republic (1999–present)

Peace agreements

Peace agreements signed
 Banjul III Agreement (1990-10-24)
 Bamako Ceasefire Agreement (1990-11-28)
 Banjul IV Agreement (1990-12-21)
 Lomé Agreement (1991-02-13)
 Yamoussoukro IV Peace Agreement (1991-10-30)
 Geneva Agreement 1992 (1992-04-07)
 Cotonou Peace Agreement (1993-07-25)
 Akosombo Peace Agreement (1994-09-12)
 Accra Agreements/Akosombo clarification agreement (1994-12-21)
 Abuja Peace Agreement (1995-08-19)

See also
 Insurgency in the Maghreb (2002–present)

Notes

References

 
Nigeria
Military history of Nigeria
Wars